Kharapallana (Brahmi: , ; Greek: Ancient Greek) was an Indo-Scythian Northern Satrap who ruled around c. 130 CE.

Name
Kharapallana's name is attested in the Greek form  and in the Brahmi form , which are derived from the Saka name , meaning "splendid youth".

Reign
He is mentioned as a "Great Satrap" (Brahmi:, Mahakṣatrapa, "Great Satrap") of Kushan ruler Kanishka I on an inscription discovered in Sarnath, and dated to the 3rd year of Kanishka (c. 130 CE), in which Kanishka mentions he was, together with Satrap Vanaspara, governor of the eastern parts of his Empire.

The inscription was discovered on an early statue of a Boddhisattva, the Sarnath Bala Boddhisattva, now in the Sarnath Museum .

Vanaspara and Kharapallana were ruling for Kanishka over the eastern provinces of the Empire, including the Benares region.

References

External links
Dates of Kanishka and the Indo-Scythians

Indo-Scythian kings
2nd-century monarchs in Asia
2nd-century Iranian people